Biagio Pelligra (born 24 June 1937, in Comiso) is an Italian stage, film and television actor.

Life and career 
Born in Comiso, Province of Ragusa, Pelligra started his acting career in the second half of the sixties, and after several minor roles he got his first role of weight in 1972, in Marco Leto's Black Holiday. Following the critical success of the film, from then he started appearing, often in secondary roles, in several art films, working with Roberto Rossellini, Paolo and Vittorio Taviani, Marco Tullio Giordana and Peter Del Monte, among others. Pelligra's popularity is however mainly linked to a series of poliziotteschi, sceneggiate and mafia films, in which he specialized in roles of criminals and villains.

Partial filmography

 Shoot Loud, Louder... I Don't Understand (1966)
 Death Laid an Egg (1968) - Chemical operator
 Commandos (1968) - Carmelo
 L'alibi (1969)
 Under the Sign of Scorpio (1969)
 Le 10 meraviglie dell'amore (1969) - Turi
 Joe Dakota (1972) - Banker (uncredited)
 Black Holiday (1973) - Mastrodonato
 Allonsanfàn (1974) - priest
 Anno uno (1974)
 Irene, Irene (1975)
 La Cecilia (1975) - Tullio
 Il marsigliese (1975) - Gigino Puleo
 Al piacere di rivederla (1976) - Marshal of Carabinieri
 The Tough Ones (1976) - Savelli
 Free Hand for a Tough Cop (1976) - Calabrese
 Bloody Payroll (1976) - Tropea
 Antonio Gramsci: The Days of Prison (1977) - Bruno
 Il mammasantissima (1979) - Don Salvatore Bufalo
 From Corleone to Brooklyn (1979) - Scalia
 Improvviso (1979) - Lo zio Luigi
 To Love the Damned (1980) - Police commissioner
 Zappatore (1980) - Accountant D'Inzillo
 The Mafia Triangle (1981) - Coppola
 Carcerato (1981) - Nicola Esposito
 L'Ombre rouge (1981)
 Laura... a 16 anni mi dicesti sì (1983) - Tito
 The Professor (1986) - The Father
 Women in Arms (1991) - Antonio Guidotti
 La Sarrasine (1992) - Salvatore Moschella
 Who Killed Pasolini? (1995) - Police officer
 An Eyewitness Account (1997) - Police Commissioner De Lio
 La collezione invisibile (2003) - Caruso
 I Vicerè (2007) - Baldassarre
 Il Capo dei Capi (2007, TV Mini-Series) - Pietro Scaglione

References

External links 

1937 births
People from Comiso
Italian male stage actors
Italian male film actors
Italian male television actors
Living people
Actors from the Province of Ragusa